Valère Thiébaud (born 26 January 1999) is a Swiss racing cyclist, who currently rides for Swiss amateur team Elite Fondations Cycling Team. He rode in the men's team pursuit event at the 2018 UCI Track Cycling World Championships.

Major results

Road
2017
 National Junior Road Championships
1st  Road race
3rd Time trial
2018
 10th Overall Tour of Black Sea
2021 
 National Under-23 Road Championships
1st  Road race
1st  Time trial

Track

2017
 3rd  Team pursuit, UEC European Junior Championships
2018
 2nd  Team pursuit, UEC European Under-23 Championships
 National Championships
2nd Individual pursuit
2nd Madison
2019
 UEC European Under-23 Championships
2nd  Points race
3rd  Team pursuit
 National Championships
2nd Points race
3rd Madison
2020
 2nd  Madison (with Robin Froidevaux), UEC European Under-23 Championships
2021
 2nd  Team pursuit, UEC European Championships
2022
 National Championships
1st  Scratch
1st  Madison

References

External links
 

1999 births
Living people
Swiss male cyclists
People from Neuchâtel
Olympic cyclists of Switzerland
Cyclists at the 2020 Summer Olympics
Sportspeople from the canton of Neuchâtel